S-Adenosylmethioninamine  is a substrate that is required for the biosynthesis of polyamines including spermidine, spermine, and thermospermine. It is produced by decarboxylation of S-adenosyl methionine.

See also 
 Adenosylmethionine decarboxylase
 Spermidine synthase
 Spermine synthase
 Thermospermine synthase (ACAULIS5)

References 

Nucleosides
Purines
Organosulfur compounds
Cations